A Scourge of Worlds: A Dungeons & Dragons Adventure is an animated film or interactive adventure. In each scene, it allows the user a choice, and different endings or different paths to the same ending will be displayed depending upon that choice.

It was released by Rhino Theatrical in June of 2003.

It continued the tradition of 'Choose Your Own Adventure' novels, using a D&D theme and storyline.

It was directed by Dan Krech.

External links

Reviews
 DVD Verdict (archived on April 4, 2016)
 E-Film Critic Review by Scott Weinberg.
 Home Theater Info
 RPG-net
 Sci-Fi Movie page

2003 animated films
2003 computer-animated films
2003 fantasy films
2003 films
Dungeons & Dragons films
Interactive films